El Clot is a station serving line 1 and line 2 of the Barcelona Metro.

The Line 1 station, opened in 1951, was built below Avinguda Meridiana between Carrer Aragó and Carrer València, and is arranged according to the Spanish solution with both side and central platforms. The lower-level Line 2 station is below Carrer València.

The Renfe regional and Rodalies commuter train station, El Clot-Aragó, is connected to the El Clot metro station via line 1. It offers connections to R1 and R2 Rodalies trains and to Ca2 regional trains.

Services

External links
 
 Clot at Trenscat.com

Railway stations in Spain opened in 1951
Transport in Sant Martí (district)
Barcelona Metro line 1 stations
Barcelona Metro line 2 stations